Foxton Locks are ten canal locks consisting of two "staircases" each of five locks, located on the Leicester line of the Grand Union Canal about  west of the Leicestershire town of Market Harborough. They are named after the nearby village of Foxton.

They form the northern terminus of a  summit level that passes Husbands Bosworth, Crick and ends with the Watford flight

Alongside the locks is the site of the Foxton Inclined Plane, built in 1900 to resolve the operational restrictions imposed by the lock flight. It was not a commercial success and only remained in full-time operation for ten years. It was dismantled in 1926, but a project to re-create it commenced in the 2000s, since the locks remain a bottleneck for boat traffic.

Description
Staircase locks are used where a canal needs to climb a steep hill, and consist of a group of locks where each lock opens directly into the next, that is, where the bottom gates of one lock form the top gates of the next. Foxton Locks are the largest flight of such staircase locks on the English canal system. The locks are equipped with side pounds, with white paddles emptying a lock into a side pound, and red paddles filling the next lock downstream from the pound. This saves water compared to the more common riser staircases, since changing the direction of traffic does not require emptying/filling almost all the locks.

Building work on the locks started in 1810 and took four years. Little changed until the building of the inclined plane resulted in the reduction in size of some of the side pounds. While the inclined plane was in operation the locks were allowed to fall into decline to an extent and in 1908 the committee released £1,000 to bring the locks back into full (nightly) operation.

In 2008, the locks became part of the European Route of Industrial Heritage, a network which seeks to recognize the most important industrial heritage sites in Europe.

The locks are usually manned during the cruising season from Easter to October and padlocked outside operating hours. This is done to prevent water shortages due to misuse and to ensure a balance between those wishing to ascend and descend. There can be lengthy delays at busy times but the actual transit should take approximately 45 minutes to one hour to complete; it is made quicker by the fact that the locks are narrow beam and the gates are light.

Tourism
The Grade II* listed locks are a popular tourist attraction and the county council has created a country park at the top. At the bottom, where the junction with the arm to Market Harborough is located, there are two public houses, a shop, trip boat and other facilities. The area is popular with ramblers, interested enthusiasts and similar.

The Foxton Canal Museum is located in the former boiler house for the plane's steam engine.  The museum covers the history of the locks and the plane, the lives of the canal workers, and other aspects of the local canal.  There is also a collection of Measham pottery. The museum opened in 1989 and is accredited by the Museums, Libraries and Archives Council.

See also
Bingley Five Rise Locks in West Yorkshire
Bingley Three Rise Locks in West Yorkshire
Foxton Inclined Plane Trust
Watford Locks in Northamptonshire
Caen Hill Locks near Devizes, Wiltshire
Fourteen Locks near Newport, South Wales
Tardebigge Locks near Bromsgrove, Worcestershire

References
 Uhlemann, H-J., (2002), Canal Lifts and Inclines of the World, Internat Limited,

Further reading

External links

Foxton Locks and Partnership
Foxton Inclined Plane Trust
Foxton Canal Museum

Buildings and structures in Leicestershire
Transport in Leicestershire
Tourist attractions in Leicestershire
Scheduled monuments in Leicestershire
Lock flights of England
Staircase locks of England
Museums in Leicestershire
Canal museums in England